Kakao T (formerly KakaoTaxi) is a Korean transportation service app launched by Kakao Mobility Corp., a subsidiary of Kakao in 2017. The service provides taxi-hailing, designated driver booking, nearby parking space searching, and real-time traffic information service.

The service was launched originally as Kakao Taxi, a taxi-calling service app launched on March 31, 2015 that connects users who needs a ride to taxi drivers. In 2017, Kakao rebranded the platform as Kakao T, where "T" stands for "transportation", merging their key transportation services into one mobile app. The service was made available in Japan in May 2017 thanks to a partnership with JapanTaxi.

Operation 

The app requires a Kakao account based on an email address and password. Personal information is collected and stored. The app facilitates connecting the user to the nearest driver in the surrounding area. All KakaoTaxi drivers are licensed taxi operators.

Privacy 
The user location is shared with the taxi driver. The user's information remains private, the driver can see only the pickup location. The app masks the user's phone number with a one-time generated number to ensure privacy.

However, the app requires the user to grant permission to access files stored on the device, to the device's call history, and to the user's address book.

The passenger receives the driver's photo, name, car model and license plate number. The app provides notification of the trip time and estimated arrival. KakaoTaxi is Android- and iOS-compatible.

Payment 

The payment method is cash, credit/debit card or one of the many transportation cards used in Korea.

References

External links 
 

Kakao
Transport companies established in 2017
Ridesharing companies
Road transport in South Korea
Online companies of South Korea
Transport companies of South Korea